Neolissochilus compressus is a species of cyprinid in the genus Neolissochilus. It inhabits Myanmar.

References

Cyprinidae
Cyprinid fish of Asia
Fish of Myanmar